Odontamblyopus is a genus of gobies native to mud bottomed coastal and estuarine habitats from Pakistan eastward to Japan.

Species
There are currently five recognized species in this genus:
 Odontamblyopus lacepedii (Temminck & Schlegel, 1845)
 Odontamblyopus rebecca (Murdy & Shibukawa, 2003)
 Odontamblyopus roseus (Valenciennes, 1837)
 Odontamblyopus rubicundus (F. Hamilton, 1822)
 Odontamblyopus tenuis (F. Day, 1876)

References

Amblyopinae